Gekkhar Suna is a town in the Islamabad Capital Territory of Pakistan. It is located at 33° 29' 10N 73° 16' 20E with an altitude of 548 metres (1801 feet).

References 

Union councils of Islamabad Capital Territory